Logan is an unincorporated community in Benton County, Arkansas, United States, located  southwest of Bentonville. The Gailey Hollow Farmstead and the McIntyre House, both listed on the National Register of Historic Places, are near Logan.

References

Unincorporated communities in Benton County, Arkansas
Unincorporated communities in Arkansas